The 11025 / 11026 Pune–Bhusaval Express is an Express train belonging to Indian Railways Central Railway zone that runs between  and  in India.

It operates as train number 11025 from Bhusaval Junction to Pune Junction and as train number 11026 in the reverse direction.

When the new time table of 2012/13 came into effect, its run was extended to Bhusaval Junction from 1 July 2012

Coaches

The 11025/26 Pune–Bhusaval Express presently has 1 AC Chair Car, 14 Second Class seating,1 sleeper & 1 General Unreserved coach & 2 EOG (Generator Car) coaches.

As with most train services in India, coach composition may be amended at the discretion of Indian Railways depending on demand.

Service

The 11025 Bhusaval–Pune Express covers the distance of 548.0 kilometres in 11 hours 40 mins (46.97 km/hr) & in 10 hours 05 mins (54.35 km/hr) as 11026 Pune–Bhusaval Express.

As the average speed of the train is below 55 km/hr, as per Indian Railways rules, its fare excludes a Superfast surcharge.

Routeing

Traction

It is hauled by either Bhusaval-based WAP-4, WAM-4 or WAG-5 pure AC locomotives or KYN-based WCAM-3 or WCAM-2/2P dual traction locomotives.

Time table

11025 Bhusaval–Pune Express leaves Bhusaval Junction on a daily basis at 00:25 hrs IST and reaches Pune Junction at 12:05 hrs IST the same day.
11026 Pune–Bhusaval Express leaves Pune Junction on a daily basis at 11:45 hrs IST and reaches Bhusaval at 21:50 hrs IST the same day.

See also
 Hutatma Express
 Khandesh Express

External links

References 

Transport in Pune
Express trains in India
Rail transport in Maharashtra